St. Catherine Creek National Wildlife Refuge was established in January 1990 to preserve, improve and create habitat for waterfowl. Intensive management programs on the refuge provide excellent winter habitat and resting areas for waterfowl in the Lower Mississippi River Valley.
 
Natchez is the oldest settlement on the Mississippi River and is world-renowned for its beautiful antebellum homes. The western refuge boundary is formed by the Mississippi River. The eastern boundary meanders along the loessal bluffs and the southern boundary borders the Homochitto River.

References
Refuge website

National Wildlife Refuges in Mississippi
Protected areas of Adams County, Mississippi
Protected areas established in 1990
1990 establishments in Mississippi
Natchez, Mississippi